The Chiahui Power Corporation is an independent power producer company in Taiwan.

History
The company was established on 29 April 1996. In 2002, Electric Power Development Company acquired the company shares from Asia Cement Corporation in 2002 and invested $75 million in the firm. In September 2020, Asia Cement purchased all share of the company previously co-owned by Electric Power Development Company for $183 million.

Power plants
 Chiahui Power Plant in Minxiong Township, Chiayi County

See also

 Electricity sector in Taiwan
 List of power stations in Taiwan

References

External links
  

1996 establishments in Taiwan
Electric power companies of Taiwan
Energy companies established in 1996
Far Eastern Group